Gilbane Building Company is an American privately held construction and facility management company, with its headquarters in Providence, Rhode Island and more than 45 office locations in the US and abroad. It was founded as a family business in 1870 and officially incorporated in 1908, Gilbane has active participation from the fourth, fifth, and sixth generations of the Gilbane family. Gilbane Building Company and Gilbane Development Company are the primary entities under Gilbane, Inc.

History

Gilbane Building Company, originally known as William H. Gilbane and Brother, was founded in 1870 by William H. Gilbane and his brother, Thomas, as a carpentry and general contracting shop in Providence, Rhode Island. The company first focused on building homes and later expanded to churches, hospitals and other buildings. William H. Gilbane’s sons, William J. Gilbane and Thomas F. Gilbane, joined the company as president and vice president in the late 1930s. In 1943, Gilbane was awarded the Army-Navy “E” Award by Under-Secretary of the Navy, James Forrestal.
Gilbane expanded its services and formed the development of its sister company, Gilbane Development Company, in 1970. Gilbane Development Company concentrates on real estate development, financing, construction, operations, and management. In that same year, William J. Gilbane Jr. and Thomas F. Gilbane Jr. joined Gilbane Construction Company. In 2010, Gilbane acquired two separate companies: Innovative Technical Solutions, Inc. (ITSI), a California-based engineering and construction company on August 4, and W.G. Mills Inc., a construction management company based in Florida on November 15. In 2014, William J. Gilbane Jr. became vice chair and director of Gilbane, Inc. In 2015, Gilbane Building Company named Michael McKelvy its president and chief operating officer. McKelvy was appointed CEO in 2016, succeeding Thomas F. Gilbane Jr., who remained at the company as chairman. 

In 2016, Gilbane was named one of the top corporate charitable contributors by the Boston Business Journal. In 2018, Gilbane completed improvements to Fenway Park. In 2020, William J. Gilbane III was named to the Gilbane Inc. board of directors. In 2022, fifth-generation Gilbane family members, Daniel M. Gilbane and Paul J. Choquette III, were named to new leadership positions with the company with Gilbane named as Managing Director and President and Choquette as Regional President. In 2022, Tom Laird was named CEO and president by Gilbane Building Company.

As of June 2022, Gilbane has more than 45 offices within the United States and internationally. Family Business Magazine ranked Gilbane as the 78th largest family business in the United States in 2009 and according to Forbes, Gilbane was ranked 63rd in America's largest private companies.

Notable projects 

 1964 New York World's Fair in Flushing Meadows, NY.
 Albright-Knox Art Gallery.
 ExxonMobil Campus in Houston, TX.
 George R. Brown Convention Center in Houston, TX.
 Georgia Tech Carbon Neutral Energy Solutions (CNES) Laboratory in Atlanta, GA.
 Lake Placid Winter Olympics Facilities in Lake Placid, NY, which hosted the XIII Olympic Winter Games in 1980.
 Legacy Union, formerly known as 620 South Tryon, in Charlotte, NC.
 Live! Casino & Hotel Philadelphia.
 Hospital for Mohawk Valley Health System in Utica, New York.
 National Archives at College Park, MD. The National Archives building is a Federal Archives building at the University of Maryland.
 Norton Museum of Art renovation.
 O'Hare International Airport, Terminal 5 in Chicago, IL.
 Prudential Center, "The Rock" New Jersey Devils Arena, Newark, NJ.
 Robert F. Kennedy U. S. Department of Justice Building in Washington D.C.
 Smithsonian Institution's National Air and Space Museum in Washington, D.C. The construction for the museum was “fast tracked” in order to be completed for the United States Bicentennial.
 Robert W. Wilson Building at the Massachusetts Museum of Contemporary Art in North Adams, MA.
 Union Station restoration in Washington D.C.
 United States Capitol Visitors Center in Washington D.C.
 Vietnam Veterans Memorial in Washington D.C. The Vietnam Veterans Memorial was established by The Vietnam Veteran’s Memorial Fund to honor and recognize American veterans of the Vietnam War.
 World War II Memorial in Washington D.C. A memorial built in 2004 to commemorate service to World War II veterans at the National Mall in Washington D.C.

Certification & partnerships

Gilbane Building Company has been a member of the U.S. Green Building Council since January 15, 1999. Members of Gilbane Building Company are also board members of the Women Builders Council and the ACE Mentor program.
On September 29, 2004, Gilbane Building Company formed the Gilbane Building Alliance with the Occupational Safety and Health Administration (OSHA). The alliance was formed to provide resources and training for employee safety. In 2016, Gilbane Building Company proposed to OSHA a recommendation for on-site construction workers in New York State to hook into safety harnesses when they are working over six feet above ground. Gilbane claimed in its proposal that making these changes to their safety policy resulted in saving the lives of 20 workers on a project in Albany, NY.
Gilbane Building Company is a partner of Rebuilding Together, an organization that improves low-income housing.

In 2018, Gilbane worked with M+W Group to build Foxconn Technology Group's Mount Pleasant campus.

In 2021, Gilbane co-founded Construction Inclusion Week, which focuses on promoting diversity, equity, and inclusion in the construction industry.

Recognition
Gilbane Building Company was recognized with the Associated General Contractors of America (AGC) Annual Construction Safety Excellence Award in 2013. In 2015, Gilbane received the CURT Construction Industry Safety Excellence Award for General Building Contractors.
In 2015, Gilbane won the Associated Builders and Contractor National Excellence in Construction Award for General Contractors. In 2016, two Gilbane projects won the AGC Alliant Build America Award.
Also in 2016, Gilbane won the Engineering News Record’s Global Best Projects Competition for the Kerry Global Technology and Innovation Centre in Naas, Ireland, and the Ministry of Defense Complex in Kabul, Afghanistan.

References

Companies based in Providence, Rhode Island
Construction and civil engineering companies of the United States
American companies established in 1870